Galibier may refer to:
 Col du Galibier, a mountain pass in France
 Bugatti 16C Galibier, an automobile